The 1992 Volta a Catalunya was the 72nd edition of the Volta a Catalunya cycle race and was held from 8 June to 14 June 1992. The race started in Sant Carles de la Ràpita and finished in Sant Feliu de Guíxols. The race was won by Miguel Induráin of the Banesto team.

General classification

References

1992
Volta
1992 in Spanish road cycling
June 1992 sports events in Europe